Coxapopha is a genus of spiders in the family Oonopidae. It was first described in 2000 by Platnick. , it contains 5 species.

References

Oonopidae
Araneomorphae genera
Spiders of Central America
Spiders of South America